is a Japanese cooking manga series written by 	Masayuki Kusumi and illustrated by Etsuko Mizusawa.  It received a nomination at the 4th Manga Taishō. It was adapted into a television series in 2012.

Characters
Hana – played by Kana Kurashina
Osoi – played by Shigeaki Kato

References

External links
Official website 

2009 manga
Akita Shoten manga
TBS Television (Japan) original programming
Mainichi Broadcasting System original programming
2012 Japanese television series debuts
Japanese television dramas based on manga
Cooking in anime and manga
2012 Japanese television series endings